Freer Independent School District is a public school district based in Freer, Texas, United States.

In 2009, the school district was rated "academically acceptable" by the Texas Education Agency.

Schools
Freer High School (Grades 9-12)
Freer Junior High (Grades 6-8)
Norman Thomas Elementary (Grades PK-5)

References

External links
 

School districts in Duval County, Texas